Korowód, or Twists of Fate, is a 2007 Polish drama film directed by Jerzy Stuhr. It stars Kamil Mackowiak, Karolina Gorczyca and Katarzyna Maciag. Supporting roles are played by Jan Frycz, Aleksandra Konieczna, Maciej Stuhr and Matylda Baczynska.

Plot 
The film revolves around Bartek Wilkosz, a student keen to exploit the academic system through plagiarism and anxious to grab a buck (or zloty) however he can. After seeing a suspicious man on a train, Bartek follows him across Poland. Once the man's identity is discovered, the lives of several people are altered.

References

External links
 Korowód at Internet Movie Database
 Official Trailer at YouTube.com

2007 films
2007 drama films
Polish drama films
2000s Polish-language films